Imran Shah may refer to:
 Imran Shah (writer)
 Imran Shah (cricketer)
 Imran Shah (field hockey)